Brady Canfield (born April 26, 1963) is an American skeleton racer who competed from 1997 to 2004. He won a bronze medal in the men's skeleton event at the 2003 FIBT World Championships in Nagano.

A native of Red Lodge, Montana, Canfield served in the United States Air Force from 1987 to 2007, retiring as a major. He now lives in Park City, Utah where he creates graphic novels including Wombat Rue.
Brady is married to Felicia Canfield, former USA skeleton athlete, attorney and managing editor of Brady Comics.

See also

Skeleton (sport)

References
FIBT profile
Men's skeleton world championship medalists since 1989
Skeletonsport.com profile

1963 births
American male skeleton racers
American comics writers
Living people
Sportspeople from Billings, Montana
Sportspeople from Albuquerque, New Mexico
United States Air Force officers
People from Red Lodge, Montana